"Get at Me Dog" is a major-label debut single by American rapper DMX, from his debut album It's Dark and Hell Is Hot. The single peaked at number 39 on the Billboard Hot 100 in the US, making it DMX's third highest peak on the chart, behind "Party Up (Up in Here)" and "Ruff Ryders' Anthem" (albeit posthumously).

Production
The song features Sheek Louch of The Lox during the chorus. The instrumental was produced by Dame Grease for Vacant Lot Production and Ruff Ryders Entertainment with an additional production by P.K. The song samples "Everything Good to You (Ain't Always Good for You)" by B. T. Express. The song appears in the 2005 video game Grand Theft Auto: Liberty City Stories .

Charts

References

DMX (rapper) songs
1998 singles
1998 songs
Ruff Ryders Entertainment singles
Def Jam Recordings singles
Music videos directed by Hype Williams
Songs written by DMX (rapper)